In field theory, the primitive element theorem is a result characterizing the finite degree field extensions that can be generated by a single element. Such a generating  element is called a primitive element of the field extension, and the extension is called a simple extension in this case. The theorem states that a finite extension is simple if and only if there are only finitely many intermediate fields. An older result, also often called "primitive element theorem", states that every finite separable extension is simple; it can be seen as a consequence of the former theorem.  These theorems imply in particular that all algebraic number fields over the rational numbers, and all extensions in which both fields are finite, are simple.

Terminology 
Let  be a field extension. If there exists such a primitive element, then  is referred to as a simple extension. 

If the field extension  has primitive element  and is of finite degree , then every element x of E can be written uniquely in the form

where  for all i. That is, the set

is a basis for E as a vector space over F.

Example 
Taking , the powers 1, α , α2, α3 can be expanded as linear combinations of 1,  with integer coefficients. This shows α is indeed a primitive element:

The theorems 
The classical primitive element theorem states: 
Every separable field extension of finite degree is simple.

This theorem applies to algebraic number fields, i.e. finite extensions of the rational numbers Q, since Q has characteristic 0 and therefore every finite extension over Q is separable.

The following primitive element theorem (Ernst Steinitz) is more general:

Using the fundamental theorem of Galois theory, the former theorem immediately follows from the latter.

Characteristic p 
For a non-separable extension  of characteristic p, there is nevertheless a primitive element provided the degree [E : F] is p: indeed, there can be no non-trivial intermediate subfields since their degrees would be factors of the prime p.

When [E : F] = p2, there may not be a primitive element (in which case there are infinitely many intermediate fields).

Constructive results
Generally, the set of all primitive elements for a finite separable extension E / F is the complement of a finite collection of proper F-subspaces of E, namely the intermediate fields. This statement says nothing in the case of finite fields, for which there is a computational theory dedicated to finding a generator of the multiplicative group of the field (a cyclic group), which is a fortiori a primitive element (see primitive element (finite field)). Where F is infinite, a pigeonhole principle proof technique considers the linear subspace generated by two elements and proves that there are only finitely many linear combinations

with c in F, that fail to generate the subfield containing both elements: 

This expression for c can take only  different values. For all other value of  then .

This is almost immediate as a way of showing how Steinitz' result implies the classical result, and a bound for the number of exceptional c in terms of the number of intermediate fields results (this number being something that can be bounded itself by Galois theory and a priori). Therefore, in this case trial-and-error is a possible practical method to find primitive elements.

History 
In his First Memoir of 1831, Évariste Galois sketched a proof of the classical primitive element theorem in the case of a splitting field of a polynomial over the rational numbers. The gaps in his sketch could easily be filled (as remarked by the referee Siméon Denis Poisson; Galois' Memoir was not published until 1846) by exploiting a theorem of Joseph-Louis Lagrange from 1771, which Galois certainly knew. It is likely that Lagrange had already been aware of the primitive element theorem for splitting fields. Galois then used this theorem heavily in his development of the Galois group. Since then it has been used in the development of Galois theory and the fundamental theorem of Galois theory. The two primitive element theorems were proved in their modern form by Ernst Steinitz, in an influential article on field theory in 1910; Steinitz called the "classical" one Theorem of the primitive elements and the other one Theorem of the intermediate fields. Emil Artin reformulated Galois theory in the 1930s without the use of the primitive element theorems.

References

External links
 J. Milne's course notes on fields and Galois theory
 The primitive element theorem at mathreference.com
 The primitive element theorem at planetmath.org
 The primitive element theorem on Ken Brown's website (pdf file)

Field (mathematics)
Theorems in abstract algebra